Saravanan a/l Thirumurugan (born 26 February 2001) is a Malaysian professional footballer who plays as a midfielder for Malaysia Super League club Kuala Lumpur City and the Malaysia U23.

Club career

Selangor II, Penang
Saravanan spent two seasons playing for Selangor II before being loaned to Penang in 2022.

Kuala Lumpur City
On 19 February 2023, Saravanan signed a contract with Kuala Lumpur City.

International career
Saravanan made one appearance in 2022 AFF U-23 Championship.

Career statistics

Club

References

External links
 

2001 births
Living people
Association football midfielders
Malaysian footballers
Malaysian people of Tamil descent
Malaysian sportspeople of Indian descent
Penang F.C. players
Kuala Lumpur City F.C. players
Malaysia Super League players
Malaysia Premier League players
Malaysia international footballers